Khopdi: The Skull is a Hindi low budget horror film of Bollywood directed by Ramesh U Lakhiani and produced by Bhagat Singh. This film was released on 30 July 1999 under the banner of Bhagat Film Productions.

Plot
A lady was raped and murdered by four men who dump her body in a shallow grave but she is revived from the grave as a vengeful ghost.

Cast
 Shakti Kapoor
 Sapna
 Jyoti Rana
 Anil Nagrath
 Vijay Solanki
 Rajesh Bakshi
 Sahiba
 Priya Rao
 Usha Pendnekar
 Bashir Babbar
 Rashmi Verma

References

External links
 

1999 films
1990s Hindi-language films
Indian horror films
1999 horror films
Hindi-language horror films